Just on 8 August 2008, the day the war started, six billion dollars left Russia, according to the finance minister.

On 8 August 2008, Fitch Ratings lowered Georgia's sovereign debt ratings from BB- to B+, commenting that there were "increased downside risks to Georgia's sovereign creditworthiness". Standard and Poor's also lowered Georgia's ratings.

While Georgia has no significant oil or gas reserves on its own, it is an important transit route that supplies the West, and journalists expressed fear that the war may damage the Baku–Tbilisi–Ceyhan pipeline (BTC pipeline), 30% of which was owned by BP. The BTC pipeline was shut down before the conflict because of the blast in Turkey on 6 August 2008. The responsibility for it was claimed by the PKK. On 8 August 2008, light sweet crude for September delivery settled down $4.82 to $115.20 on the New York Mercantile Exchange. The war created further problems for BP. 

Georgian government said that Russian air forces devastated the port of Poti on 8 August, which the Georgian government called "a key port for the transportation of energy sources," close to the Baku-Supsa pipeline and the Supsa oil terminal. On 9 August 2008, Georgia said that Russian fighter jets targeted the Baku-Tbilisi-Ceyhan pipeline.

On 12 August 2008, BP closed the Baku-Supsa Pipeline and the South Caucasus Pipeline for the safety reasons. Gas supplies through the South Caucasus Pipeline were resumed on 14 August 2008.

Harvard Business School professor Noel Maurer disagreed with the view that Russo-Georgian War had a substantial negative impact on Russian financial markets: "Russian indices were in decline well before the war started.  If anything has happened since, it is that the decline has slowed.  This is not consistent with the hypothesis that the markets are punishing Russia for the war."

With regard to the financial market reaction to the Russo-Georgian War, Agence France-Presse reported that unidentified analysts believed that Russian stock exchange decline in August and September 2008, were attributed to "a mix of falling energy prices, global market turmoil and political issues including worries over the war with Georgia."

References

Russo-Georgian War